Mustard oil can mean either the pressed oil used for cooking, or a pungent essential oil also known as volatile oil of mustard. The essential oil results from grinding mustard seed, mixing the grounds with water, and extracting the resulting volatile oil by distillation. It can also be produced by dry distillation of the seed. Pressed mustard oil is used as cooking oil in some cultures, but sale is restricted in some countries due to high levels of erucic acid. Varieties of mustard seed also exist that are low in erucic acid.

Pressed oil

Oil makes up about 30% of mustard seeds. It can be produced from black mustard (Brassica nigra), brown mustard (B. juncea), and white mustard (B. alba).

Culinary use
Having a distinctive pungent taste, the use of the oil is a feature of Bengali and North Indian cooking, as well as Bangladeshi cuisine. It is sometimes used as a substitute for ghee.

Chemical composition
Its pungent flavor is due to allyl isothiocyanate, a phytochemical of plants in the mustard family, Brassicaceae (for example, cabbage, horseradish or wasabi). 

Mustard oil has about 60% monounsaturated fatty acids (42% erucic acid and 12% oleic acid); it has about 21% polyunsaturated fats (6% the omega-3 alpha-linolenic acid and 15% the omega-6 linoleic acid), and it has about 12% saturated fats.

Potential toxicity
Mustard oil has high levels of erucic acid. Erucic acid may have toxic effects on the heart at high doses. An association between the consumption of dietary erucic acid and increased myocardial lipidosis, or heart disease, has not been established for humans, although given what is known about erucic acid, it can be a reason to expect that humans would be susceptible to this.

The U.S. Food and Drug Administration prohibits the import or sale of expressed mustard oil in the U.S. for use in cooking due to its high erucic acid content. By contrast, the FDA has classified essential mustard oil, which has a much lower erucic acid content, as generally recognized as safe, and allows its use in food.Mustard and Mustard Oil Safety, National Capital Poison Center] (last accessed January 26, 2023). Expressed mustard oil is permitted in the U.S. as a massage oil, with a required "for external use only" label.

Nutritional information
According to the USDA, 100 grams of mustard oil contains 884 calories of food energy, and is 100% fat. The fat composition is 11% saturated fat, 59% monounsaturated fat, and 21% polyunsaturated fat.

Essential oil

The pungency of the condiment mustard results when ground mustard seeds are mixed with water, vinegar, or other liquid (or even when chewed). Under these conditions, a chemical reaction between the enzyme myrosinase and a glucosinolate known as sinigrin from the seeds of black mustard (Brassica nigra) or brown Indian mustard (Brassica juncea) produces allyl isothiocyanate. By distillation one can produce a very sharp-tasting essential oil, sometimes called volatile oil of mustard, containing more than 92% allyl isothiocyanate. The pungency of allyl isothiocyanate is due to the activation of the TRPA1 ion channel in sensory neurons. White mustard (Brassica hirta) does not yield allyl isothiocyanate, but a different and milder isothiocyanate degraded from sinalbin rather than sinigrin.

Allyl isothiocyanate serves the plant as a defense against herbivores. Since it is harmful to the plant itself, it is stored in the harmless form of a glucosinolate, separate from the enzyme myrosinase. Once the herbivore chews the plant, the noxious allyl isothiocyanate is produced. Allyl isothiocyanate is also responsible for the pungent taste of horseradish and wasabi. It can be produced synthetically, sometimes known as synthetic mustard oil.

See also

 List of mustard brands
Mustard plant
Mustard seed
Mustard (condiment)
Brassica species
Brassica nigra
Brassica juncea
White mustard
Rapeseed
Canola
Brassicaceae
Myrosinase
thioglycoside
Glucoside
Glucosinolate
Sinigrin
Sinalbin
Isothiocyanate
Allyl isothiocyanate
Bengali cuisine
Odia cuisine
Oil cake

References

Cooking oils
Vegetable oils
Essential oils